P. monoica may refer to:
 Pimpinella monoica, a plant species
 Puccinia monoica, a rust fungus species

See also